

Canadian Football News in 1900
The ORFU prohibited the use of CIRFU players and the CRU stated that players must block with their bodies and not hold opponents with their arms or hands.

Regular season

Final regular season standings
Note: GP = Games Played, W = Wins, L = Losses, T = Ties, PF = Points For, PA = Points Against, Pts = Points
*Bold text means that they have clinched the playoffs

League Champions

Playoffs

ORFU Playoff

Ottawa advances to the Dominion Championship.

Dominion Championship

References

 
Canadian Football League seasons